Indranath Srikanta O Annadadidi is a Bengali drama film directed by Haridas Bhattacharya and produced by Kanan Devi, based on a part of the famous novel Srikanta by Sarat Chandra Chattopadhyay. The film was released on 3 October 1959 under the banner of Sreemati Pictures.

Plot
Annada, brought up in a conservative middle-class family in a village, elopes with a snake charmer, Sahuji. Her husband tortures her regularly, but Annada remains loyal to him. Young Srikanta treats her like his elder sister Didi. Srikanta often visits her with his daredevil and adventurous friend Indranath. When Annada's husband dies, she leaves the village permanently.

Cast
 Bikash Roy as Sahuji
 Gurudas Banerjee as Pisemosai
 Partha Pratim Chowdhury as Indranath
 Kanan Devi as Annada
 Molina Devi
 Sajal Ghosh as Srikanta

References

External links
 

1959 films
1950s Bengali-language films
Bengali-language Indian films
Films based on works by Sarat Chandra Chattopadhyay
Films based on Indian novels
Films set in the 1910s
Indian black-and-white films
Indian drama films